Chad is an American sitcom created by Nasim Pedrad, who also stars as the titular role in the series. The series premiered on April 6, 2021, on TBS.

In February 2016, Chad was originally sold to Fox and ordered for a series in 2016 titled Chad: An American Boy with the original concept about a "14-year-old boy in the throes of adolescence who is tasked with being the man of the house", with the original pilot written by Pedrad and Rob Rosell. In August 2016, it was announced that the series would not be moving forward at Fox and would be shopped to other networks. In May 2019, the series was picked up by TBS for a 10-episode order. In May 2021, the series was renewed for a second season. In July 2022, TBS announced that while the second season of Chad had been filmed, that they would not be airing it or ordering a third season, as the channel was pivoting away from scripted content.

On October 26, 2022, it was announced that The Roku Channel had acquired the series and would air the second season.

Premise
Chad (Pedrad) is a 14-year-old Persian-American boy on a mission to become popular as he navigates his first year of high school. During the first season, Chad's friendships and sanity are pushed to the limits as he uses every tactic at his disposal to befriend the cool kids while enduring his mother's new dating life and reconciling with his cultural identity.

Cast

Main
 Nasim Pedrad as Chad Amani
 Jake Ryan as Peter
 Saba Homayoon as Naz Amani
 Paul Chahidi as Hamid Amani 
 Ella Mika as Niki Amani 
 Alexa Loo as Denise

Recurring
 Madeleine Arthur as Marjorie
 Thomas Barbusca as Reid
 Phillip Mullings Jr. as Ikrimah
 Jarrad Paul as Charles

Guest
 Armani Jackson as Joey
 Lucius Hoyos as Raul
 Aidan Laprete as Kevin
Kensington Tallman as Avery
Lily Fisher as Margaret
Houshang Touzie as Farhad
Dave Ahdoot as Pasha
Parviz Pedrad as Mohsen
Aidan Fiske as Liam

Episodes

Production

Development
On February 10, 2016, it was reported that a comedy starring Nasim Pedrad was given a pilot order at Fox. On August 5, 2016, it was announced that the idea would not be moving forward at Fox, and would be shopped elsewhere to broadcast, cable and streaming networks. On May 15, 2019, TBS gave Chad a series order, along with the first trailer of the series being released. On May 19, 2021, TBS renewed the series for a second season; which was scheduled to premiere in July 2022. Instead, hours before the second season was scheduled to premiere, TBS canceled the series.

On October 26, 2022, it was announced that The Roku Channel had acquired the series and would air the second season.

Filming
In April 2021, it was announced that the series will be relocating its production to California, to take advantage of tax incentives provided by the California Film Commission.

Reception

Viewership
On April 7, 2021, it was revealed that Chad debuted as the top-rated scripted cable program of 2021. The series premiere received 1.9 million viewers across two airings, with 765,000 viewers in the targeted 18-49 demographic.

Critical response
On review aggregator Rotten Tomatoes, the first seasons holds an approval rating of 81% based on 16 reviews, with an average rating of 7.80/10. The website's consensus reads, "Chad's caustic humor can be downright painful, but Nasim Pedrad's commitment to the bit gives this adolescent farce a heart." On Metacritic, the season has a 65 out of 100 based on 12 critics, indicating "generally favorable reviews".

Ratings

References

External links
 
 
 

2021 American television series debuts
2020s American teen sitcoms
2020s American high school television series
2020s American LGBT-related comedy television series
2020s American single-camera sitcoms
English-language television shows
American LGBT-related sitcoms
American television series revived after cancellation
Cross-dressing in television
Television series about teenagers
TBS (American TV channel) original programming
Roku original programming
Television series by 3 Arts Entertainment